The 1966–67 Toronto Maple Leafs season was the 50th season of the Toronto NHL franchise, 40th as the Maple Leafs. The Leafs finished third in the NHL with a record of 32–27–11 for 75 points to qualify for the playoffs. Toronto defeated the first-place Chicago Black Hawks four games to two in the semi-finals before upending their arch-rival Montreal Canadiens in six games to win their thirteenth Stanley Cup in franchise history. This remains the last time that the Maple Leafs have won the Stanley Cup, or even advance it to the Finals.

Offseason

Intra-League Draft

Inter-League Draft

Reverse Draft

Free agents

Regular season

Five to a Crease
In 1966–67, the Maple Leafs had five goaltenders suit up during the regular season. Besides Bower and Sawchuk, the Maple Leafs employed Bruce Gamble, Al Smith, and Gary Smith. As Bower struggled with injuries, Al Smith actually sat on the bench for two of the last three Stanley Cup games. For many inside the organization, the controversy was that Smith was on the bench, and not a proven player like Gamble. The concern was that if Sawchuk was injured, having Smith instead of Gamble would be a huge risk. The source of the controversy was that Bruce Gamble was competing for the Rochester Americans. Imlach was a part owner of the Americans, and was anxious to protect Rochester's roster at playoff time, as a means of protecting his investment.

Final standings

Record vs. opponents

Schedule and results

|- align="center"
|1||T||October 22, 1966||4–4 || align="left"|  New York Rangers (1966–67) ||0–0–1||1
|- align="center" bgcolor="#FFBBBB"
|2||L||October 23, 1966||0–1 || align="left"| @ New York Rangers (1966–67) ||0–1–1||1
|- align="center" bgcolor="#CCFFCC"
|3||W||October 26, 1966||3–2 || align="left"|  Detroit Red Wings (1966–67) ||1–1–1||3
|- align="center"
|4||T||October 29, 1966||3–3 || align="left"|  Boston Bruins (1966–67) ||1–1–2||4
|-

|- align="center"
|5||T||November 2, 1966||2–2 || align="left"|  Montreal Canadiens (1966–67) ||1–1–3||5
|- align="center"
|6||T||November 3, 1966||2–2 || align="left"| @ Detroit Red Wings (1966–67) ||1–1–4||6
|- align="center" bgcolor="#CCFFCC"
|7||W||November 5, 1966||3–1 || align="left"|  New York Rangers (1966–67) ||2–1–4||8
|- align="center"
|8||T||November 6, 1966||3–3 || align="left"| @ New York Rangers (1966–67) ||2–1–5||9
|- align="center" bgcolor="#CCFFCC"
|9||W||November 9, 1966||3–2 || align="left"| @ Montreal Canadiens (1966–67) ||3–1–5||11
|- align="center" bgcolor="#FFBBBB"
|10||L||November 10, 1966||0–4 || align="left"| @ Boston Bruins (1966–67) ||3–2–5||11
|- align="center"
|11||T||November 12, 1966||3–3 || align="left"| @ Detroit Red Wings (1966–67) ||3–2–6||12
|- align="center" bgcolor="#FFBBBB"
|12||L||November 13, 1966||1–6 || align="left"| @ Chicago Black Hawks (1966–67) ||3–3–6||12
|- align="center" bgcolor="#CCFFCC"
|13||W||November 19, 1966||5–1 || align="left"|  Montreal Canadiens (1966–67) ||4–3–6||14
|- align="center"
|14||T||November 20, 1966||2–2 || align="left"| @ Chicago Black Hawks (1966–67) ||4–3–7||15
|- align="center" bgcolor="#CCFFCC"
|15||W||November 23, 1966||6–3 || align="left"|  Chicago Black Hawks (1966–67) ||5–3–7||17
|- align="center" bgcolor="#CCFFCC"
|16||W||November 26, 1966||4–2 || align="left"|  Boston Bruins (1966–67) ||6–3–7||19
|- align="center" bgcolor="#FFBBBB"
|17||L||November 27, 1966||0–5 || align="left"| @ New York Rangers (1966–67) ||6–4–7||19
|- align="center" bgcolor="#CCFFCC"
|18||W||November 30, 1966||3–2 || align="left"|  Montreal Canadiens (1966–67) ||7–4–7||21
|-

|- align="center" bgcolor="#CCFFCC"
|19||W||December 3, 1966||5–2 || align="left"|  Detroit Red Wings (1966–67) ||8–4–7||23
|- align="center" bgcolor="#CCFFCC"
|20||W||December 4, 1966||8–3 || align="left"| @ Boston Bruins (1966–67) ||9–4–7||25
|- align="center" bgcolor="#FFBBBB"
|21||L||December 7, 1966||3–6 || align="left"| @ Montreal Canadiens (1966–67) ||9–5–7||25
|- align="center" bgcolor="#CCFFCC"
|22||W||December 10, 1966||5–3 || align="left"|  Chicago Black Hawks (1966–67) ||10–5–7||27
|- align="center" bgcolor="#FFBBBB"
|23||L||December 11, 1966||1–4 || align="left"| @ Detroit Red Wings (1966–67) ||10–6–7||27
|- align="center" bgcolor="#CCFFCC"
|24||W||December 14, 1966||2–1 || align="left"|  Boston Bruins (1966–67) ||11–6–7||29
|- align="center" bgcolor="#FFBBBB"
|25||L||December 17, 1966||1–3 || align="left"|  New York Rangers (1966–67) ||11–7–7||29
|- align="center" bgcolor="#FFBBBB"
|26||L||December 18, 1966||1–3 || align="left"| @ Chicago Black Hawks (1966–67) ||11–8–7||29
|- align="center" bgcolor="#FFBBBB"
|27||L||December 21, 1966||2–6 || align="left"| @ Montreal Canadiens (1966–67) ||11–9–7||29
|- align="center" bgcolor="#CCFFCC"
|28||W||December 24, 1966||3–0 || align="left"|  Boston Bruins (1966–67) ||12–9–7||31
|- align="center" bgcolor="#CCFFCC"
|29||W||December 25, 1966||4–2 || align="left"| @ Boston Bruins (1966–67) ||13–9–7||33
|- align="center" bgcolor="#FFBBBB"
|30||L||December 31, 1966||1–5 || align="left"|  Chicago Black Hawks (1966–67) ||13–10–7||33
|-

|- align="center" bgcolor="#CCFFCC"
|31||W||January 1, 1967||2–1 || align="left"| @ New York Rangers (1966–67) ||14–10–7||35
|- align="center"
|32||T||January 4, 1967||1–1 || align="left"|  New York Rangers (1966–67) ||14–10–8||37
|- align="center" bgcolor="#CCFFCC"
|33||W||January 7, 1967||5–2 || align="left"|  Boston Bruins (1966–67) ||15–10–8||38
|- align="center" bgcolor="#FFBBBB"
|34||L||January 8, 1967||1–3 || align="left"| @ Detroit Red Wings (1966–67) ||15–11–8||38
|- align="center" bgcolor="#CCFFCC"
|35||W||January 11, 1967||2–1 || align="left"| @ Montreal Canadiens (1966–67) ||16–11–8||40
|- align="center" bgcolor="#CCFFCC"
|36||W||January 14, 1967||5–2 || align="left"|  Detroit Red Wings (1966–67) ||17–11–8||42
|- align="center" bgcolor="#FFBBBB"
|37||L||January 15, 1967||0–4 || align="left"| @ Chicago Black Hawks (1966–67) ||17–12–8||42
|- align="center" bgcolor="#FFBBBB"
|38||L||January 19, 1967||2–6 || align="left"| @ Detroit Red Wings (1966–67) ||17–13–8||42
|- align="center" bgcolor="#FFBBBB"
|39||L||January 21, 1967||4–5 || align="left"|  Detroit Red Wings (1966–67) ||17–14–8||42
|- align="center" bgcolor="#FFBBBB"
|40||L||January 22, 1967||1–3 || align="left"| @ Boston Bruins (1966–67) ||17–15–8||42
|- align="center" bgcolor="#FFBBBB"
|41||L||January 25, 1967||1–3 || align="left"|  Montreal Canadiens (1966–67) ||17–16–8||42
|- align="center" bgcolor="#FFBBBB"
|42||L||January 28, 1967||2–5 || align="left"|  Chicago Black Hawks (1966–67) ||17–17–8||42
|- align="center" bgcolor="#FFBBBB"
|43||L||January 29, 1967||1–5 || align="left"| @ Chicago Black Hawks (1966–67) ||17–18–8||42
|-

|- align="center" bgcolor="#FFBBBB"
|44||L||February 1, 1967||1–7 || align="left"| @ Montreal Canadiens (1966–67) ||17–19–8||42
|- align="center" bgcolor="#FFBBBB"
|45||L||February 5, 1967||1–4 || align="left"| @ New York Rangers (1966–67) ||17–20–8||42
|- align="center" bgcolor="#FFBBBB"
|46||L||February 8, 1967||2–5 || align="left"|  Detroit Red Wings (1966–67) ||17–21–8||42
|- align="center"
|47||T||February 11, 1967||4–4 || align="left"|  Chicago Black Hawks (1966–67) ||17–21–9||43
|- align="center" bgcolor="#CCFFCC"
|48||W||February 12, 1967||2–1 || align="left"| @ Boston Bruins (1966–67) ||18–21–9||45
|- align="center" bgcolor="#CCFFCC"
|49||W||February 15, 1967||6–0 || align="left"|  New York Rangers (1966–67) ||19–21–9||47
|- align="center" bgcolor="#CCFFCC"
|50||W||February 18, 1967||5–3 || align="left"|  Boston Bruins (1966–67) ||20–21–9||49
|- align="center" bgcolor="#CCFFCC"
|51||W||February 22, 1967||5–2 || align="left"|  Montreal Canadiens (1966–67) ||21–21–9||51
|- align="center" bgcolor="#CCFFCC"
|52||W||February 23, 1967||4–2 || align="left"| @ Detroit Red Wings (1966–67) ||22–21–9||53
|- align="center" bgcolor="#CCFFCC"
|53||W||February 25, 1967||4–0 || align="left"|  Detroit Red Wings (1966–67) ||23–21–9||55
|- align="center" bgcolor="#CCFFCC"
|54||W||February 26, 1967||4–2 || align="left"| @ New York Rangers (1966–67) ||24–21–9||57
|-

|- align="center"
|55||T||March 1, 1967||1–1 || align="left"| @ Montreal Canadiens (1966–67) ||24–21–10||58
|- align="center" bgcolor="#CCFFCC"
|56||W||March 4, 1967||3–0 || align="left"|  Chicago Black Hawks (1966–67) ||25–21–10||60
|- align="center" bgcolor="#FFBBBB"
|57||L||March 5, 1967||2–5 || align="left"| @ Chicago Black Hawks (1966–67) ||25–22–10||60
|- align="center" bgcolor="#CCFFCC"
|58||W||March 8, 1967||6–4 || align="left"|  Montreal Canadiens (1966–67) ||26–22–10||62
|- align="center"
|59||T||March 11, 1967||2–2 || align="left"|  New York Rangers (1966–67) ||26–22–11||63
|- align="center" bgcolor="#FFBBBB"
|60||L||March 12, 1967||0–5 || align="left"| @ Chicago Black Hawks (1966–67) ||26–23–11||63
|- align="center" bgcolor="#FFBBBB"
|61||L||March 15, 1967||2–4 || align="left"|  Detroit Red Wings (1966–67) ||26–24–11||63
|- align="center" bgcolor="#CCFFCC"
|62||W||March 18, 1967||9–5 || align="left"|  Chicago Black Hawks (1966–67) ||27–24–11||65
|- align="center" bgcolor="#CCFFCC"
|63||W||March 19, 1967||6–5 || align="left"| @ Detroit Red Wings (1966–67) ||28–24–11||67
|- align="center" bgcolor="#FFBBBB"
|64||L||March 22, 1967||3–5 || align="left"|  Montreal Canadiens (1966–67) ||28–25–11||67
|- align="center" bgcolor="#CCFFCC"
|65||W||March 23, 1967||5–3 || align="left"| @ Boston Bruins (1966–67) ||29–25–11||69
|- align="center" bgcolor="#CCFFCC"
|66||W||March 25, 1967||4–3 || align="left"|  Boston Bruins (1966–67) ||30–25–11||71
|- align="center" bgcolor="#FFBBBB"
|67||L||March 26, 1967||0–4 || align="left"| @ New York Rangers (1966–67) ||30–26–11||71
|- align="center" bgcolor="#FFBBBB"
|68||L||March 29, 1967||3–5 || align="left"| @ Montreal Canadiens (1966–67) ||30–27–11||71
|-

|- align="center" bgcolor="#CCFFCC"
|69||W||April 1, 1967||5–1 || align="left"|  New York Rangers (1966–67) ||31–27–11||73
|- align="center" bgcolor="#CCFFCC"
|70||W||April 2, 1967||5–2 || align="left"| @ Boston Bruins (1966–67) ||32–27–11||75
|-

Player statistics

Forwards
Note: GP= Games played; G= Goals; AST= Assists; PTS = Points; PIM = Penalties In Minutes

Defensemen
Note: GP= Games played; G= Goals; AST= Assists; PTS = Points; PIM = Points

Goaltending
Note: GP= Games played; W= Wins; L= Losses; T = Ties; SO = Shutouts; GAA = Goals Against

Playoffs

|- align="center" bgcolor="#FFBBBB"
|1||L||April 6, 1967||2–5 || || align="left" | @ Chicago Black Hawks || 0–1
|- align="center" bgcolor="#CCFFCC"
|2||W||April 9, 1967||3–1 || || align="left" | @ Chicago Black Hawks || 1–1
|- align="center" bgcolor="#CCFFCC"
|3||W||April 11, 1967||3–1 || || align="left" | Chicago Black Hawks || 2–1
|- align="center" bgcolor="#FFBBBB"
|4||L||April 13, 1967||3–4 || || align="left" | Chicago Black Hawks || 2–2
|- align="center" bgcolor="#CCFFCC"
|5||W||April 15, 1967||4–2 || || align="left" | @ Chicago Black Hawks || 3–2
|- align="center" bgcolor="#CCFFCC"
|6||W||April 18, 1967||3–1 || || align="left" | Chicago Black Hawks || 4–2
|-

|- align="center" bgcolor="#FFBBBB"
|1||L||April 20, 1967||2–6 || || @ Montreal Canadiens || 0–1
|- align="center" bgcolor="#CCFFCC"
|2||W||April 22, 1967||3–0 || || @ Montreal Canadiens || 1–1
|- align="center" bgcolor="#CCFFCC"
|3||W||April 25, 1967||3–2 || 2OT ||Montreal Canadiens || 2–1
|- align="center" bgcolor="#FFBBBB"
|4||L||April 27, 1967||2–6 || || Montreal Canadiens || 2–2
|- align="center" bgcolor="#CCFFCC"
|5||W||April 29, 1967||4–1 || || @ Montreal Canadiens || 3–2
|- align="center" bgcolor="#CCFFCC"
|6||W||May 2, 1967||3–1 || || Montreal Canadiens || 4–2
|-

Transactions
The Maple Leafs have been involved in the following transactions during the 1966–67 season.

Trades

Draft picks
Toronto's draft picks at the 1966 NHL Amateur Draft held at the Mount Royal Hotel in Montreal, Quebec.

Awards and honors
 Dave Keon, Conn Smythe Trophy

References
 Maple Leafs on Hockey Database
 Maple Leafs on Database Hockey

Stanley Cup championship seasons
Toronto Maple Leafs seasons
Toronto Maple Leafs season, 1966-67
Tor
Tor